The Feral Brewing Company is a brewery in the Swan Valley, Western Australia.

History
Feral Brewing first opened in October 2002, and was founded by Alistair Carragher and Brendan Varis with a vision to "craft beers that ... were a little on the wild side". Varis has a degree in brewing and fermentation science and Carragher's background was in hospitality and sales.

In January 2012 the Feral Brewing Company and Nail Brewing formed Brewcorp Pty Ltd developing a brewhouse and warehouse facilities in Bassendean.

In October 2017, Feral was bought by Coca-Cola Amatil.

Brewing technique
Feral Brewing Company brews a range of beers. They bottle five year-round beers: the Feral White (also known as the Belgium White), the Hop Hog (an American IPA), Smoked Porter (a smoked beer or Rauchbier), Sly Fox (a Session Blonde Ale) the Karma Citra (a Black India Pale Ale) and Biggie Juice (a New England India Pale Ale). Beers are available for purchase from retail outlets.

Distribution
The brewery doubles as a restaurant and distributes beers in Australia.

The brewery's beer list includes various styles including Belgium white Ales, Pilsners, American IPAs, and Lambic style sour beers as well as other barrel-conditioned and fermented styles.

Beers
 Raging Flem (7.6% alc/vol), a Belgian-style India Pale Ale
 Feral White (4.6% alc/vol), a Belgian-style Witbier. 
 Hop Hog (5.8% alc/vol), an American-style India Pale Ale
 Golden Ace (5.6% alc/vol), a Belgian-style Golden Ale   
 Smoked Porter (4.7% alc/vol), a smoked beer
 Watermelon Warhead (2.9% alc/vol), a Berliner Weisse infused with watermelons
 Runt (4.7% alc/vol), an Australian Pale Ale
 Rust (6.0% alc/vol), a Belgian-style Dubbel
 Karma Citra (5.8% alc/vol), a Black India Pale Ale
 Fantapants (7.4% alc/vol), an Imperial Red India Pale Ale
 Razorback (10% alc/vol), a Barleywine
 Boris (11.5%), a Russian Imperial Stout
 Amber (3.6% alc/vol), an Australian style Amber Ale
 B.F.H (Barrel Fermented Hog) (5.8% alc/vol), a barrel fermented American Pale Ale
 White Hog (4.8% alc/vol), a Belgian-style Pale Ale
 "War Hog" (7.5%) American IPA
 “Biggie Juice” (6.0%) New England India Pale Ale

Awards
The Feral Brewing Company has won a number of awards including
From the Australian International Beer Awards:
 2009 Champion Hybrid Beer - Feral White
 2009 Champion Small Brewery
 2009 Champion Exhibitor
 2009 Champion Ale - Hop Hog
 2010 Champion Ale - The Runt
 2011 Champion Ale - Hop Hog
 2011 Best Beer - Hop Hog
 2012 Champion Large Australian Brewery
 2012 Best International Pale Ale  Hop Hog 
 2012 Best Scotch and Barley Wine Razorback
 2013 Champion Medium Australian Brewery
 2013 Best Porter - Boris

From the Perth Royal Beer Show:
 2010 Best Commercial Brewery
 2010 Best Commercial Beer - Hop Hog
 2010 Best Western Australian Brewery
 2010 Best Western Australian Beer - Hop Hog
 2011 Best American Style Pale Ale - Hop Hog
 2011 Best Indian Pale Ale - Fanta Pants
 2011 Best Ale Draught - Fanta Pants
 2011 Best Western Australian Beer - Hop Hog
 2012 Best American Style Pale Ale - Hop Hog

From the Beer and Brewer People's Choice Awards:
 2011 Best Australian Beer - Hop Hog
 2012 Young Brewer of the Year - Will Irving
 2012 Best Australian Beer - Hop Hog

From the Hong Kong International Beer Awards:
 2012 Best Indian Pale Ale & Champion Beer - Hop Hog

From the Western Australian Tourism Awards:
 2012 Tourism Wineries, Distilleries and Breweries - Gold

From GABS Hottest 100 Aussie Craft Beers of the Year
 2012 People's Choice Winner - Hop Hog
 2013 People's Choice Winner - Hop Hog
 2014 People's Choice Winner - Hop Hog

See also 

 List of breweries in Australia

References

Bibliography

External links 

Australian beer brands
Australian companies established in 2002
Beer brewing companies based in Western Australia
Food and drink companies established in 2002